The Mexico Championship is a golf tournament on the Korn Ferry Tour. It was first played in May 2013 at the El Bosque Country Club in León, Mexico.

The Mexican Open had been a Web.com Tour event from 2008 to 2012, and was played at El Bosque the last four of these years. When it became a PGA Tour Latinoamérica event in 2013, the Mexico Championship took its place on the Web.com schedule.

Winners

Bolded golfers graduated to the PGA Tour via the Korn Ferry Tour regular-season money list.

External links
Coverage on the Web.com Tour's official site

Former Korn Ferry Tour events
Golf tournaments in Mexico
Sport in Guanajuato
León, Guanajuato
Spring (season) events in Mexico